Olaf Iversen (27 August 1894 – 11 September 1921) was a Norwegian footballer. He played in one match for the Norway national football team in 1914.

References

External links
 

1894 births
1921 deaths
Norwegian footballers
Norway international footballers
Place of birth missing
Association footballers not categorized by position